Frank Waota (born 6 December 1971) is a former track and field sprinter from Ivory Coast who specialized in the 200 metres. He represented his country at the Summer Olympics in 1992 and 1996, and ran at the World Championships in Athletics in 1993. He was a finalist in the 4 × 100 metres relay with the Ivory Coast men's relay team at the 1992 Summer Olympics and the 1993 World Championships in Athletics. He holds personal bests of 6.65 seconds for the 60 metres, 10.28 seconds for the 100 metres and 20.68 seconds for the 200 m.

Waota finished seventh in 4 × 100 metres relay at the 1993 World Championships, together with teammates Ouattara Lagazane, Jean-Olivier Zirignon and Ibrahim Meité. The same quartet won a silver medal at the 1994 Jeux de la Francophonie. He was the 200 m winner at the West and North African Athletics Championships in 1995.

Participating in the 200 m at the 1996 Summer Olympics, he was knocked out in the quarter-finals. He finished in second place in the 200 m at the French Athletics Championships that year.

International competitions

National titles
French Indoor Athletics Championships
60 metres: 1994

See also
List of Ivoirians

References

External links

1971 births
Living people
Ivorian male sprinters
Olympic athletes of Ivory Coast
Athletes (track and field) at the 1992 Summer Olympics
Athletes (track and field) at the 1996 Summer Olympics
World Athletics Championships athletes for Ivory Coast